Akkareyakkareyakkare, also known Akkare Akkare Akkare is a 1990 Indian Malayalam-language buddy cop comedy film directed by Priyadarshan and written by Sreenivasan. It stars Mohanlal, Sreenivasan, M. G. Soman, Mukesh, Maniyanpilla Raju, Parvathy and Nedumudi Venu in major roles. It is a sequel to 1987's Nadodikkattu and 1988s Pattanapravesham; Mohanlal and Sreenivasan reprises their roles. However, Thilakan and Innocent, who have appeared in the previous films, do not appear in this film. Also, a new cast of Nedumudi Venu, Mukesh and Maniyanpilla Raju appears. M. G. Soman plays a character role, having appeared as himself in Nadodikkattu. The story follows C.I.Ds Dasan and Vijayan on an investigation for a gold crown 
stolen to the United States.

The film was produced by G. P. Vijayakumar and distributed by Seven Arts Release. It was filmed in Houston, Texas and the Greater Los Angeles Area, California, New York, Brooklyn,  Though the film did good business in the box office it was not a profitable venture due to its high production costs.

Plot

When a priceless gold crown is stolen from India, Ramdas (Mohanlal) and Vijayan (Sreenivasan) are sent to the United States to retrieve it. The only clue they have is the pseudonym "Paul Barber" and a piece of torn black shirt. With these couple of clues, the comic duo embark on the adventure. When they arrive in the United States, they are taken by two gangsters to a building where other gang members try to murder them. They are welcomed by Sivadasa Menon (Nedumudi Venu), an official of the Indian Embassy and a friend of the Police Commissioner Krishnan Nair (M. G. Soman). The investigation is funded by Sivadasa Menon.

Dasan and Vijayan suspect Sivadasa Menon to be the thief when he refuses to give them money for their investigation and also refuses to help Vijayan who was arrested by the police due to a misunderstanding caused by the shopkeepers who understand only English. Their suspicion grows when they hear him talking to his wife about selling their Crown TV and buying a new one, but believe he was talking about selling the stolen crown  to erase evidence. They overhear him at night commanding his wife to tailor clothes, but they believe he is murdering someone by forcing them to cut their hands, neck and ribs. They tell him they have withdrawn from the investigation and spent all the money he gave for enjoying themselves and believe that the piece of black shirt with them is his. They decide to get the rest of the shirt.

They disguise themselves as black laundry men, and their attempts fail when Vijayan talks Malayalam. He is injured in an accident at the laundry shop and ends up in the hospital. Both Dasan and Vijayan try to seduce a nurse Sethulakshmi (Parvathy Jayaram). Meanwhile, the real criminal, an American gangster Paul Barber "Wilfred" believes two innocent men Surendran (Mukesh) and Gopi (Maniyanpilla Raju) are Dasan and Vijayan, they are forced out of their paying guest accommodation and all their acquaintances avoid them. Commissioner Krishnan Nair arrives in the United States after Sivadasa Menon tells him that Dasan and Vijayan are misusing funds. Surendran and Gopi become very desperate after their bank accounts are frozen and decide to steal to live. Krishnan Nair enters a hotel disguised as a Filipino man Akira Kurosawa. Surendran and Gopi steal his suitcase and he follows them, but he is misidentified by the hotel staff and they force him out. He catches them and they reveal how they have been treated. The trio decide to kill Dasan and Vijayan, but all their attempts fail.

Surendran and Gopi find out that they are unknowingly preventing Dasan and Vijayan from catching Paul Barber and his gang because the gang thinks they are Dasan and Vijayan, and that the case is in fact very straightforward. They also realise that it is because of them that Dasan is sensing foul play. They accidentally get the crown and give it to Vijayan, only to be chased by Paul Barber and his gang. Dasan wants to see more glory than Vijayan, and decides to steal the crown from him. At the airport, there is a fight involving Sivadasa Menon, Paul Barber and his gang, Krishnan Nair, Dasan and Vijayan. They are ambushed by American policemen, to whom they confess are CIDs. Paul Barber and his gang are killed and Sivadasa Menon's innocence is revealed. When they return they are felicitated.

Cast
 Mohanlal as Ramdas / Dasan   
 Sreenivasan as Vijayan
 M. G. Soman as City Police Commissioner Krishnan Nair IPS / Akira Kurosawa
 Mukesh as Surendran
 Maniyanpilla Raju as Gopi 
 Nedumudi Venu as Sivadasa Menon
 Parvathy as Sethulakshmi
 Sukumari as House Owner
 K. P. A. C. Lalitha as Sivadasa Menon's Wife
 Jagadish as Peter
 Prameela as Krishnan Nair's Wife

Locations
Akkare Akkare Akkare is one of the first Malayalam films to be shot in the United States. The various filming locations were in,

O'Hare International Airport, Chicago, Illinois
Bellaire Hospital, Houston, Texas
Port of Long Beach, Long Beach, California
Disneyland, Anaheim, California
Six Flags Magic Mountain, Valencia, Santa Clarita, California
THE BLOOD-RED MENAGERIE – The Dolphin Circus
Foreign consulate in New York City, New York

The film was also shot in the city of Burbank, California.

Music
The music composition was done by Ouseppachan. The audio songs were released by the label J. S. Audio.

Cultural references
"Don't Let It End" by Styx plays in the backdrop when Dasan and Vijayan come down the escalator at the Chicago Ohare International Airport

Legacy
The dialogue "Sadhanam Kayyilundo" from the film came as a popular catchphrase in Malayalam. As well as "Meenaviyal Enthayo Entho", the popular one-liner delivered by Sreenivasan found place in Printed T-shirts.

References

External links 
 

1990 films
1990s Malayalam-language films
Films set in Houston
Films shot in Chicago
Films shot in California
Films about Indian Americans
Films with screenplays by Sreenivasan
1990s buddy comedy films
Indian sequel films
Films directed by Priyadarshan
DasanVijayan3
Indian buddy comedy films
Films scored by Ouseppachan
1990 comedy films